Koderu is a village in West Godavari district in the state of Andhra Pradesh in India. The nearest railway station is Palakollu (PKO) located at a distance of 3.87 Km.

Demographics
 India census, Koderu has a population of 1729 of which 868 are males while 861 are females. The average sex ratio of Koderu village is 992. The child population is 164, which makes up 9.49% of the total population of the village, with sex ratio 929. In 2011, the literacy rate of Koderu village was 78.72% when compared to 67.02% of Andhra Pradesh.

See also 
 West Godavari district

References 

Villages in West Godavari district